The drill (Mandrillus leucophaeus) is a primate of the family Cercopithecidae (Old World monkeys), related to baboons and even more closely to mandrills.

Description
 

 
The body is overall a dark grey-brown. Mature males have a pink lower lip and white chin on a dark grey to black face with raised grooves on the nose. The rump is pink, mauve and blue. Female drills lack the pink chin.

Taxonomy
Two subspecies of drill are accepted by some authorities, but are not considered distinct by others:
 Mainland drill, Mandrillus leucophaeus leucophaeus
 Bioko drill, Mandrillus leucophaeus poensis
Their closest relative is the mandrill (Mandrillus sphinx), found from southern Cameroon through mainland Equatorial Guinea (Rio Muni), Gabon and into the Congo. The two species are allopatric across the Sanaga River.

Biology
A dominant male leads a multi-male multi-female group of 20-30 individuals, and is father to most of the young. This group may join others, forming super groups of over 100 individuals. They are seasonally semi-nomadic, and will often rub their chests onto trees to mark their territory. They are semi-terrestrial, foraging mainly on the ground, but climbing trees to sleep at night. The females give birth to a single baby; twins have been recorded once at the Drill Rehab & Breeding Center in Nigeria. The average longevity in captivity is 28 years.
The diet is primarily frugivorous, taking a wide range of fruit, but they also eat herbs, roots, eggs, insects, and small mammals on occasion.

Distribution
 
Drills are found only in Cross River State in Nigeria, southwestern Cameroon (south to the Sanaga River), and on Bioko Island, part of Equatorial Guinea, in rainforest habitats. Their entire global range is less than 40,000 km2.

Conservation
Drills are among Africa’s most endangered mammals, and are listed by the IUCN as the highest conservation priority of all African primates. Drill numbers have been declining in all known habitat areas for decades as a result of illegal commercial hunting, habitat destruction, and human development; as few as 3,000 drills may remain in the wild, with the highest population estimate only 8,000. A total of 174 drills recovered from illegal capture are in semicaptivity at the Drill Rehabilitation and Breeding Centre in Nigeria, with high success rates in breeding recorded there, and about 40 in other zoos internationally.

References

External links

Pandrillus - Drill and primate conservation group operating in Nigeria and Cameroon
The Limbe Wildlife Centre (LWC) - A wildlife rescue and rehabilitation project situated in the South West Region of Cameroon.

Mandrillus
Primates of Africa
Mammals of Cameroon
Mammals of Equatorial Guinea
Mammals of West Africa
Fauna of Bioko
Mammals described in 1807
Taxa named by Frédéric Cuvier